Danilo Di Luca (born 2 January 1976) is a former Italian professional road racing cyclist, best known for winning the 2007 Giro d'Italia, but also for several positive doping tests, the last of which resulting in a lifetime ban from the sport.

Di Luca is also one of six riders to have won each of the three Ardennes classics; he won the Amstel Gold Race and La Flèche Wallonne in 2005, and Liège–Bastogne–Liège in 2007. During his career, Di Luca rode for the Riso Scotti,  and  squads.

Di Luca's career was also dogged by numerous infractions, involving three suspensions in relation to doping. In 2007, Di Luca was suspended for three months towards the end of the season, for visiting previously banned doctor Carlo Santuccione, which later escalated into the Oil for Drugs case. In 2009, at the Giro d'Italia, Di Luca tested positive on two occasions for CERA, and was given a backdated – to July 2009 – two-year ban in February 2010, which was later reduced to nine months. His third positive test came just before the 2013 Giro d'Italia, when he tested positive for erythropoietin (EPO) in an out-of-competition test. Di Luca expressed surprise at the test results, but he was given a lifetime ban in December 2013.

Danilo Di Luca wrote his autobiography Bestie da Vittoria, which means "Beasts for victories". Such book is also a denunciation of the use of doping substances among cyclists and the use of anti-doping controls as a way to manipulate competition results.

Career

Early years
Born in Spoltore, province of Pescara, Di Luca began his professional career in 1998 in the Riso Scotti team. He showed talent by winning the under-23 version of the Giro D'Italia. His first pro win was in 1999, when, moving to Cantina Tollo-Alexia Alluminio, he won the first stage of the Giro d'Abruzzo. He remained in the team taking wins in 2001 such as the fourth stage of the Giro d'Italia and the Giro di Lombardia. Then, he transferred to Saeco-Longoni Sport.

During his time at Saeco-Longoni he lost the Vuelta al País Vasco on the last stage, a mountain time trial in which Andreas Klöden took the lead and the win. Combined with injuries and lack of confidence of the team directors, his performance suffered. In 2004 Italian officials investigated Di Luca for doping. Cyclingnews.com said: "Di Luca was recorded in several phone conversations with Eddy Mazzoleni in which he allegedly talked about doping products, the investigation led to Di Luca's non-participation in the 2004 Tour de France."

2005
He led the team for the spring classics. His first victory came in the first stage of the UCI ProTour race Vuelta al País Vasco, which he won overall after defeating Aitor Osa in the final time trial. He won the Amstel Gold Race and La Flèche Wallonne, taking the ProTour leader's white jersey.

Di Luca was seen as suited to races lasting only a few days. His success in the 2005 Giro d'Italia came as a surprise. Here he won two stages and finished fourth. He finished fifth in the Tour de Pologne. With a fourth in the 2005 Züri-Metzgete, he became 2005 UCI ProTour champion.

2006
Di Luca was forced to retire from the 2006 Tour de France, due to a urinary infection. He recovered to compete in the 2006 Vuelta a España, winning the fifth stage and holding the lead (ceding it to Janez Brajkovič). Di Luca's performances in the classics, the Giro, and other races, were a letdown from the triumphs of 2005.

2007
Di Luca won Milano–Torino in March and Liège–Bastogne–Liège in April. He took stages 4 and 12 en route to the victory in the 2007 Giro d'Italia. After the Giro, it was revealed that Di Luca had unspecified low hormone levels. Italian authorities are determining if they are a consequence of racing at a high level for three weeks or some kind of masking agent. On 28 September, Di Luca withdrew from the UCI road championship calling his treatment "a scandal" after doping allegations.

Di Luca was leading the 2007 UCI ProTour when he was suspended before the final race, the Giro di Lombardia, due to alleged involvement in the Oil for Drugs case, for which he was suspended for three months through the close season.

2008–2009
In 2008, Di Luca had a quiet year as his new team, were not invited to many races. In 2009, they received a wildcard entry to the Giro d'Italia and Di Luca won the fourth stage. He then came second on the fifth stage, gaining the pink jersey as race leader, and extended his lead by winning the tenth stage. He lost time on the two time trial stages and finished second overall, winning the points classification.

On 22 July 2009, it was announced that Di Luca had tested positive for CERA on 20 and 28 May 2009, during the Giro d'Italia. He was provisionally suspended with immediate effect by the UCI. He had been targeted for testing using information from his biological passport's blood profile, previous test results and his race schedule. On 8 August, his positive tests were confirmed. On 1 February 2010, the Italian Olympic committee (CONI) suspended him for two years (effective as of 22 July 2009) for the Giro doping incident. Di Luca must also pay a  fine, as well as the costs incurred in both the analysis and counter-analysis of his Giro samples: Di Luca indicated his intention to contest the decision.

2010–2011

On 15 October 2010, CONI announced that Di Luca's ban had been reduced to nine months and seven days, allowing Di Luca to return as of that very day (though the season was nearly over). This was due to his reported cooperation with investigators, detailing doping methods. CONI also announced the reduction of Di Luca's fine, from €280,000 to €106,400, but the UCI contends that he will still have to pay the full amount based on when his doping incident occurred. His results from the 2009 Giro were stricken from the record.

His notable results were fourth of the Giro d'Italia's 6th stage and fourth in the Tour de Suisse's first stage.

2013
In April 2013, Di Luca signed for the  team, who were subsequently awarded a wildcard place to race in the Giro d'Italia. On 24 May, while Di Luca was riding in the Giro, the UCI announced that he had had an adverse finding in an out-of-competition doping test at his home on 29 April. Di Luca was fired by his team who instructed him to leave the race by his own means. He was banned for life by CONI on 5 December. He also had his results stripped from 29 April and ordered to pay €37,985 in fines and costs.

Career achievements

Major results

1999
 1st 1 stage Giro d'Abruzzo
 2nd Giro di Lombardia
2000
 1st GP Industria & Artigianato di Larciano
 1st Trofeo Pantalica
 1st 1 stage Giro d'Italia
 1st 2 stages Giro d'Abruzzo
 2nd Overall Tour of the Basque Country
1st 1 stage
2001
 1st Giro di Lombardia
 1st 1 stage, Giro d'Italia
 2nd 1 stage, Setmana Catalana de Ciclisme
 1st Overall Giro d'Abruzzo
1st 1 stage
2002
 1st Giro del Veneto
 1st GP Fred Mengoni
 1st Trofeo Laigueglia
 2nd Overall Tirreno–Adriatico
1st 2 stages
 1st 1 stage Volta a la Comunitat Valenciana
 1st 1 stage Vuelta a España
2003
 1st Coppa Placci
 1st Tre Valli Varesine
 1st 1 stage, Tirreno–Adriatico
 1st Overall Tour de Ligure
1st 1 stage
 3rd Amstel Gold Race
2004
 1st Trofeo Matteoti
 1st Brixia Tour
 1st Stage 4 Vuelta a Murcia
 2nd La Flèche Wallonne
 4th Amstel Gold Race
2005
 1st  UCI ProTour
 1st  Overall Tour of the Basque Country
1st Stage 1
 1st Amstel Gold Race
 1st La Flèche Wallonne
 4th Overall Giro d'Italia
1st Stages 3 & 5
 4th Züri–Metzgete
 5th Overall Tour de Pologne
2006
 1st Stage 5 Vuelta a España
 6th La Flèche Wallonne
 9th Liège–Bastogne–Liège
 9th Züri–Metzgete
2007
 1st  Overall Giro d'Italia
1st Stages 4 & 12
 1st Liège–Bastogne–Liège
 1st Milano–Torino
 1st Stage 3 Settimana Internazionale di Coppi e Bartali
 3rd Amstel Gold Race
 3rd La Flèche Wallonne
2008
 1st  Overall Settimana Ciclistica Lombarda
1st Stage 4
 1st Giro dell'Emilia
 1st  Mountains classification Tour of Britain
 8th Overall Giro d'Italia
2009
 1st Stage 4 Giro del Trentino
 1st Stage 1 (TTT) Settimana Ciclista Lombarda
 2nd Overall Giro d'Italia
1st  Points classification
1st Stages 4 & 10
2012
 1st Gran Premio Nobili Rubinetterie
 4th Overall Tour of Austria
1st Stage 2
2013
 6th Giro di Toscana
 10th GP Industria & Artigianato di Larciano

Grand Tour general classification results timeline

DNF=Did not finish
DSQ=Disqualified

See also
 List of doping cases in cycling

References

External links

Italian male cyclists
Giro d'Italia winners
Italian sportspeople in doping cases
Italian Giro d'Italia stage winners
Italian Vuelta a España stage winners
Doping cases in cycling
Sportspeople from the Province of Pescara
1976 births
Living people
Cyclists from Abruzzo
Cyclists at the 2000 Summer Olympics
Olympic cyclists of Italy
UCI ProTour winners
Sportspeople banned for life
People from Spoltore